The American Journal of Sexuality Education is a quarterly peer-reviewed academic journal established in 2005 and published by Routledge. It covers research on sex education. The editor-in-chief is William J. Taverner. It is an official journal of the American Association of Sexuality Educators, Counselors and Therapists.

History
The journal was formerly published by Haworth Press, which was acquired by Routledge in 2007. From 1975 through 2001, the journal was named Journal of Sex Education and Therapy, with Gary F. Kelly serving as editor. It was relaunched in 2005 as the American Journal of Sexuality Education.

Abstracting and indexing
The American Journal of Sexuality Education is abstracted and indexed in EBSCO databases,  Emerging Sources Citation Index, PsycINFO, and Scopus.

References

External links
 

Sex education in the United States
Publications established in 2005
Sexology journals
Education journals
Quarterly journals
Routledge academic journals
English-language journals